The following article is a summary of the 2021–22 football season in Belgium, which is the 119th season of competitive football in the country and will run from August 2021 until June 2022.

Men's football

League season

Promotion and relegation
The following teams had achieved promotion or suffered relegation going into the 2021–22 season.

Belgian First Division A

Regular season

Belgian First Division B

Amateur Leagues

Belgian National Division 1

Belgian Division 2

Division VFV A

Division VFV B

Division ACFF

Belgian Division 3

Division VFV A

Division VFV B

Division ACFF A

Division ACFF B

Cup competitions

Transfers

UEFA competitions
Champions Club Brugge qualified directly for the group stage of the Champions League, while runners-up Genk started in the qualifying rounds where they lost out, causing them to drop into the Europa League. Third-placed Antwerp also played the Europa League after coming through one qualifying round. Fourth and fifth from the previous season, Anderlecht and Gent respectively, had the change to qualify for the 2021–22 UEFA Europa Conference League, but only Gent succeeded, while Anderlecht were eliminated in the last round of qualifying.

European qualification for 2022–23 summary

Managerial changes
This is a list of changes of managers within Belgian professional league football:

First Division A

First Division B

See also
 2021–22 Belgian First Division A
 2021–22 Belgian First Division B
 2021–22 Belgian National Division 1
 2021–22 Belgian Division 2
 2021–22 Belgian Division 3
 2021–22 Belgian Cup
 2021 Belgian Super Cup

Notes

References

 
Belgium
Belgium